Bin There Dump That is a North American waste disposal and dumpster rental franchise. It was founded by Mark Crossett in 2001 and had its headquarters in Mississauga, Ontario, Canada.

As of October 2022, it has over 250 franchised territories in North America.

History
Mark Crossett founded Bin There Dump That in 2001 while working as a general contractor in Mississauga, Ontario, Canada. In 2004, Micheal Kernaghan and Mark Crossett decided to create the Bin There Dump That franchise and began awarding franchises in Canada. In 2008, the company was awarded its first franchise in the United States.

Micheal Kernaghan is the company's president and CEO and the CEO of its parent company, That Franchise Group. He has been associated with the company since 2003. John Ferracuti joined in 2008 as a general manager and is now the chief development officer and operating officer.

In 2004, the company teamed up with, That Franchise Group to begin awarding franchises across North America. In mid-April 2021, Bin There Dump That reached a milestone with the opening of its 200th franchise. Overall, the number of Bin There Dump That franchises is up by 53.7% over the past three years.

Bin There Dump That business provides dumpster rental services, construction cleanup, junk removal, and hauling services. Rentable roll-offs range from 4 to 20 yards for community members to rent dumpsters for any size project.

The company also utilizes a residential service for local homeowners, contractors, remodelers, roofers, or anyone needing a dumpster. They have dumpster consultancy to help with the right dumpster for the project.

Bin There Dump That has franchises in 40 states and provinces in the United States and Canada. The company's dumpsters have also been featured on television programs like Holmes on Homes, the Property Brothers, and Military Makeover.

References

External links
Official website

Waste management companies of Canada
Companies based in Mississauga